Pride & Joy, is an American sitcom television series that was shown on NBC from March 21 to May 2, 1995. The series revolved around a Manhattan couple, Greg and Amy Sherman (played by Craig Bierko and Julie Warner), with a newborn son, and a couple across the hall, Nathan and Carol Green (Jeremy Piven and Caroline Rhea). The series ended after one season.

Cast
Craig Bierko as Greg Sherman
Julie Warner as Amy Sherman
Jeremy Piven as Nathan Green
Caroline Rhea as Carol Green
Natasha Pavlovich as Katya

Episodes

References

External links

NBC original programming
1990s American sitcoms
1995 American television series debuts
1995 American television series endings
Television shows set in New York City
Television series by ABC Studios